Virginija Paulauskaitė (born 3 March 1972) is a Lithuanian curler and curling coach. Virginija started curling in 2004 and currently works as a chief manager and director of professional curling club Skipas in Vilnius.

Teams

Women's

Mixed

Mixed doubles

Record as a coach of national teams

References

External links

 Virginija Paulauskaitė - Rekvizitai.lt
  ("Cheers! Curling with Virginia Paulauskaite, exercise with ballet elements and a healthy weekend breakfast" - video-interview with Virginia Paulauskaite)
 Articles with tag "Virginija Paulauskaite" on site Sportas.info
 

Living people
1972 births
Lithuanian female curlers

Lithuanian curling coaches
Place of birth missing (living people)